The J. C. Penney Building is a former department store building in downtown Newberg, Oregon, United States. Built around 1927, the structure was added to the National Register of Historic Places on June 13, 2007. The brick building is 1-and-a-half stories tall.

See also
J. C. Penney

References

Buildings and structures in Newberg, Oregon
Department stores on the National Register of Historic Places
National Register of Historic Places in Yamhill County, Oregon
1927 establishments in Oregon
Commercial buildings completed in 1927
Commercial buildings on the National Register of Historic Places in Oregon
JCPenney